The League of the Just (German: Bund der Gerechten) or League of Justice was a Christian communist international revolutionary organization.  It was founded in 1836 by branching off from its ancestor, the League of Outlaws (German: Bund der Geächteten), which had formed in Paris in 1834.  The League of the Just was largely composed of German emigrant artisans.

In 1847, the League of the Just merged with the Communist Correspondence Committee (German: Kommunistisches Korrespondenzkomitee), an organization led by Karl Marx and Friedrich Engels, creating the Communist League.  The new group tasked Marx and Engels with writing a political platform for itself.  The resulting document was The Communist Manifesto.

History 
Jacob Venedey and Theodore Schuster founded the League of Outlaws in Paris in 1834. They modeled the organization closely after Philippe Buonarroti's vision of the "Universal Democratic Carbonari" as an egalitarian international revolutionary fellowship organization, perhaps the first of its kind. Its members were German emigrants. Schuster's 1834 pamphlet, Confession of faith of an outlaw has been suggested as the first vision of marginalized people joining together in a coming revolution.

At its peak, the League of Outlaws had about 100 members in Paris and 80 in Frankfurt am Main. At this time, Schuster focused his efforts on advocating for the unification of Germany and organized middle-class republicans into the League of Germans. As Schuster's and other key members' attention was focused on this work, the working class members of the Outlaws rallied around the leadership of Wilhelm Weitling.
This group formed the League of the Just in Paris in 1836 as an offshoot from the League of Outlaws. The Outlaws dissipated in 1838 as their members prioritized other associations.

Members of the League of the Just were German journeymen artisans, primarily tailors and woodworkers.
Their stated goal was "the establishment of the Kingdom of God on Earth, based on the ideals of love of one's neighbor, equality and justice". This was also referred to by the League as the "new Jerusalem". The motto of the League of the Just was "All men are brothers". They have been described as followers of François-Noël Babeuf and as "utopian-communist". They were anticipating a social revolution, which one of their leaders, Karl Schapper, described as "the great resurrection day of the people." Friedrich Engels wrote dismissively of the League as essentially similar to other French secret societies except that it was German.

The latter league had a pyramidal structure inspired by the secret society of the Republican Carbonari, and shared ideas with Saint-Simon and Charles Fourier's utopian socialism. Their goal was to establish a "Social Republic" in the German states which would campaign for "freedom", "equality" and "civic virtue".

Wilhelm Weitling was the most prominent leader in the movement. Weitling proclaimed himself a "social Luther" and denounced private property and money as a source of corruption and exploitation. Other significant leaders included Karl Schapper, Bruno Bauer, Joseph Moll, August Hermann Ewerbeck, and Johann Hoeckerig.

Many members of the League of the Just were involved in the 12 May 1839 Blanquist revolt. This led to the group being expelled by the French government. They proceeded to move to London. In 1840 in London they established a front organization called the Educational Society of German Workingmen. They continued to grow, until reaching a peak membership of over 1,000 people.

In 1845 there was significant public debate within the League between Weitling, who advocated for an immediate uprising of workers, and Karl Schapper, who considered this premature, especially after his experience in the 1839 uprising. Schapper advocated for a longer campaign of popular education to prepare the masses for revolution.

Karl Marx was hesitant about joining the League due to political disagreements, but was convinced by Joseph Moll that he could be more influential debating as a member from within the organization when Moll visited Brussels in January 1847. In June 1847, the League of the Just merged with the Communist Correspondence Committee to form the Communist League.

See also 
 Communist League
 German Workers Educational Association

Citations

References

Further reading 
 

Political parties established in 1836
1847 disestablishments
19th century in Paris
1836 establishments in France